Harry E. Rodenhizer Jr. (December 20, 1927 – October 10, 2007) was a two-time mayor of Durham, North Carolina.

Mayoralties

First mayoralty
Rodenhizer was elected in the 1979 Durham mayoral election.

During Rodenhizer's first term as mayor, he was instrumental in getting the Durham Freeway extended along its modern route.

Rodenhizer lost reelection in the 1981 Durham mayoral election.

Second mayoralty
Rodenhizer was reelected to a second non-consecutive term in the 1991 Durham mayoral election.

In his second term, he laid the financial groundwork for what would become Durham Bulls Athletic Park, persuading the owner of the minor league team to keep the Bulls in Durham.

Rodenhizer lost reelection in the 1993 Durham mayoral election.

Other activities
From 1978 to 2004, Rodenhizer owned and operated the Pizza Palace, a Durham institution located on Ninth Street, near Duke University's East Campus. Rodenhizer transferred ownership and day-to-day operation of the restaurant to his daughter, Faye, when it was relocated to Guess Road in 2004.

He unsuccessfully attempted to retake the mayoralty again in the 1995 Durham mayoral election.

References

1927 births
2007 deaths
20th-century American politicians
Mayors of Durham, North Carolina
United States Navy personnel of the Korean War